The U.S. state of Massachusetts has 14 counties, though eight of these fourteen county governments were abolished between 1997 and 2000. The counties in the southeastern portion of the state retain county-level local government (Barnstable, Bristol, Dukes, Norfolk, Plymouth) or, in one case, (Nantucket County) consolidated city-county government. Vestigial judicial and law enforcement districts still follow county boundaries even in the counties whose county-level government has been disestablished, and the counties are still generally recognized as geographic entities if not political ones. Three counties (Hampshire, Barnstable, and Franklin) have formed new county regional compacts to serve as a form of regional governance.

Abolitions of some county governments 
Mismanagement of Middlesex County's public hospital in the mid-1990s left that county on the brink of insolvency, and in 1997 the Massachusetts legislature stepped in by assuming all assets and obligations of the county.  The government of Middlesex County was officially abolished on July 11, 1997.  Later that year, the Franklin County Commission voted itself out of existence.  The law abolishing Middlesex County also provided for the elimination of Hampden County and Worcester County on July 1, 1998.  This law was later amended to abolish Hampshire County on January 1, 1999; Essex County and Suffolk County on July 1 of that same year; and Berkshire County on July 1, 2000. State law allows other counties either to abolish themselves, or to reorganize as a "regional council of governments", as Hampshire and Franklin Counties have done. The governments of Bristol, Plymouth, and Norfolk Counties remain substantially unchanged. Barnstable and Dukes Counties have adopted modern county charters, enabling them to act as efficient regional governments.  Dukes County in particular has a strong regional planning agency known as the Martha's Vineyard Commission.

District Attorneys 
Jurisdictional areas for District Attorneys are created by state law and while some follow traditional county boundaries, names and geographic areas covered are often different. Criminal matters in Essex County are handled by the District Attorney for the Eastern District; in Middlesex County by the District Attorney for the Northern District; in Worcester County by the District Attorney for the Middle District; in Dukes, Barnstable and Nantucket counties by the District Attorney for the Cape and Islands District and in Franklin and Hampshire counties by the District Attorney for the Northwestern District. The districts for the counties of Berkshire, Bristol, Hampden, Norfolk, Plymouth and Suffolk are the same in geography and nomenclature as the  respective counties, and the District Attorneys for the Eastern, Middle, and Northern Districts are commonly known as the Essex County, Worcester County, and Middlesex County District Attorneys, respectively.

Historical counties 
Eleven other historical counties have existed in Massachusetts, most becoming defunct when their lands were absorbed into the colony of New Hampshire or the state of Maine, both of which were created out of territory originally claimed by Massachusetts colonists. The oldest counties still in Massachusetts are Essex County, Middlesex County, and Suffolk County, created in 1643 with the original Norfolk County which was absorbed by New Hampshire and bears no relation to the modern Norfolk County. When these counties were created, they were a part of the Massachusetts Bay Colony, which would remain separate from the Plymouth Colony and that colony's counties until 1691. Hampden County, created in 1812, is the most recently created county still in Massachusetts, although Penobscot County, Maine bore that distinction until Maine broke off from Massachusetts in 1820. The majority of Massachusetts counties are named in honor of English place names, reflecting Massachusetts' colonial heritage.

Shire town 
The term shire town is the statutory term for the Massachusetts town having a county court and administration offices; a county can have multiple shire towns. County seat is the standard term used in general communications by the Massachusetts government.

FIPS code
The Federal Information Processing Standard (FIPS) code, used by the United States government to uniquely identify counties, is provided with each entry. FIPS codes are five-digit numbers; for Massachusetts the codes start with 25 and are completed with the three-digit county code. The FIPS code for each county in the table links to census data for that county.

List of current counties 

 |}

Former counties

See also 
 Administrative divisions of Massachusetts
 Government of Massachusetts – section on local government
 List of former United States counties

References

External links
Historical Data Relating to the Incorporation of and Abolishment of Counties in the Commonwealth of Massachusetts, Secretary of the Commonwealth of Massachusetts

 
Massachusetts, counties in
Counties